Ascension Parish is a parish located in the U.S. state of Louisiana. As of the 2020 census, the population was 126,500. Its parish seat is Donaldsonville. The parish was created in 1807. Ascension Parish is part of the Baton Rouge metropolitan statistical area.

Ascension Parish is one of the 22 parishes that make up Acadiana, the heartland of the Cajun people and their culture. This is exhibited by the prevalence of the French or Cajun French language heard throughout the parish, as well as the many festivals celebrated by its residents, including the Boucherie Festival, Lagniappe Music and Seafood Festival, Crawfish Festival, and the Jambalaya Festival. The largest incorporated city in Ascension Parish, Gonzales, is celebrated as the "Jambalaya Capital of the World".

History 
Early European settlers of the area that was developed as Ascension and Gonzales were, for the most part, of French and Spanish ancestry. They settled among the Houma Indians who lived in the area.

Among the projects and plans carried out by Luis de Unzaga 'le Conciliateur' while he was governor of Louisiana between 1769 and 1777 was the promotion of new settlements by Europeans, among them were French Acadians and Malaga in the fertile Mississippi region and more specifically in the Unzaga Post or 'Puesto de Unzaga' that he created in 1771 in Pointe Coupee, the parish of Saint Gabriel in 1773 and Fort Manchac in 1776; the Ascension people occupied land at the confluence of the aforementioned European settlements.

During the American Civil War, desertions had been of major concern to the Confederate States Army. Henry Watkins Allen, before he was governor, reported more than eight thousand deserters and draft-dodgers about Bayou Teche. There were some 1,200 deserters in Livingston, St. Tammany, and Ascension parishes.

Planters in Ascension Parish later complained of raids by guerrillas. In 1864, planter W.R. Hodges requested soldiers to protect the planted fields from such attacks. Union soldiers were accused of "wandering about at will, and helping themselves . . . to whatever could be found," explains the historian John D. Winters in his The Civil War in Louisiana (1963).

During the historic 2016 Louisiana Floods, around one-third of all homes in Ascension Parish were flooded; 15,000 homes and businesses took on water, mostly in the Galvez-St. Amant area, prompting a visit to St. Amant by then-presidential candidate, Donald J. Trump.

Geography
It is the fourth-smallest parish in Louisiana by total area.

Waterways

 Alligator Bayou
 Amite River
 Amite River Diversion Canal
 Anderson Canal
 Babin Canal
 Bayou Antoine
 Bayou Manchac
 Bayou Narcisse
 Bayou Pierre
 Bayou  Pas
 Bayou Conway
 Bayou Francois
 Bayou Lafourche
 Bayou Napoleon
 Bayou Verret
 Bayou Vicknair
 Black Bayou
 Blind River
 Boudreau Bayou
 Boyle Bayou
 Braud Bayou
 Cocodrie Bayou
 Cotton Bayou
 Crowley Ditch
 Duckroost Bayou
 Flat Lake
 Grand Goudine Bayou
 Hackett Canal
 Heath Bayou
 Henderson Bayou
 Jim Bayou
 Johnson Bayou
 Lake Millet
 Lake Villars
 Laurel Ridge Canal
 McCall Bayou
 Mississippi River
 Muddy Creek
 New River
 New River Canal
 Old New River
 Panama Canal
 Pipeline Canal
 Rocky Canal
 Roddy Bayou
 Saveiro Canal
 Sides Bayou
 Smith Bayou
 Spanish Lake
 Welsh Gully

Major highways

  Louisiana Highway 1
  Interstate 10
  Louisiana Highway 16
  Louisiana Highway 18
  Louisiana Highway 22
  Louisiana Highway 30
  Louisiana Highway 42
  Louisiana Highway 44
  U.S. Highway 61
  Louisiana Highway 70
  Louisiana Highway 73

Adjacent parishes
 East Baton Rouge Parish  (north)
 Livingston Parish  (northeast)
 St. John the Baptist Parish  (east)
 St. James Parish  (southeast)
 Assumption Parish  (southwest)
 Iberville Parish  (west)

Communities

Cities
 Donaldsonville (parish seat)
 Gonzales

Town
 Sorrento

Census-designated places
 Darrow
 Lemannville
 Prairieville

Unincorporated communities

 Aben
 Acy
 Barmen
 Barton
 Belle Helene
 Bowden
 Brignac
 Brittany
 Brusly McCall
 Bullion
 Burnside
 Cofield
 Cornerview
 Duckroost
 Duplessis
 Dutchtown
 Galvez
 Geismar
 Hillaryville
 Hobart
 Hohen Solms
 Hope Villa
 Lake
 Little Prairie
 McElroy
 Marchand
 Miles
 Modeste
 Mount Houmas
 Oak Grove
 Noel
 Palo Alto
 Philadelphia Point
 Saint Elmo
 Saint Amant
 Smoke Bend
 Southwood
 Weber City

Demographics

In 1810, the parish had a population of 2,219; since then, its population has steadily increased despite some decades of population decline. In 1900, the parish's population reached a first historic high of 24,142 before increasing again to 58,214 at the 1990 U.S. census. At the 2010 census, Ascension Parish's population grew to 107,215; and at the 2020 United States census, there were 126,500 people, 44,267 households, and 32,305 families residing in the parish.

Having historic settlement by French and Spanish colonials during the periods of French and Spanish Louisiana, Ascension Parish's racial and ethnic composition has remained predominantly non-Hispanic white throughout a portion of its history. With the greater diversification of the United States at the 2020 census, non-Hispanic white residents were 62.96% of the total population. Black or African American Louisianians and others made up 23.95% of the population, followed by Hispanics or Latinos of any race (8.21%), Asians (1.33%), multiracial Americans (3.32%), Native Americans (0.21%), and Pacific Islanders (0.03%).

Among its residents at the 2021 American Community Survey's 1-year estimates program, households had a median income of $72,662 and mean income of $92,143. Families had a median income of $85,632; married-couple families $111,445; and non-family households $32,498. Overall, residents of Ascension Parish are wealthier than nearby East Baton Rouge Parish.

Religiously and spiritually, Christianity is the dominant religion for the parish. According to the Association of Religion Data Archives in 2020, the Roman Catholic Church was the single-largest Christian denomination for the parish, served primarily by the Roman Catholic Diocese of Baton Rouge. The overall Catholic population in Ascension Parish was 39,260 in 2020. Non-denominational or inter-denominational Christian churches—whether independent Bible churches, United and Uniting, etc.—were the second largest Christian group in the parish with 9,430 members. Collectively, Baptists throughout the Southern Baptist Convention, Full Gospel Baptist Church Fellowship, and National Baptist Convention of America made up 5,043 religious adherents. Parish-wide Protestant statistics reflect an increase in non- or inter-denominational Christianity throughout Louisiana, outgrowing Methodism as the second-largest Protestant group for the state per the Association of Religion Data Archives 2020 religion census; the growth of non/inter-denominational Christianity for the area represented a broader trend nationwide, where the movement began to constitute the largest segment of American Protestantism.

Education
Ascension Parish School Board operates the local public schools. The parish is also home to private schools and—since 1998, to River Parishes Community College.

Media
Two newspapers are based in Ascension Parish's two cities, Donaldsonville and Gonzales. The Gonzales Weekly Citizen is a bi-weekly newspaper formed after the merger of The Gonzales Weekly (founded 1920) and The Ascension Citizen (founded 1996). The Donaldsonville Chief, founded in 1871, is the parish's longest-continually-published newspaper.

Law, government and politics

Long a Democratic bastion, since the late 20th century, like much of the rest of the South, Ascension Parish has registered more Republicans and election results have shifted. Since 2000, nearly 14,000 new voters have registered in Ascension Parish, and fewer than 1,000 of those are Democrats.

Democrats still lead in registrants with 28,181; Republicans follow with 16,218. There are also 13,052 "No Party" registrants, as permitted under Louisiana law.

Ascension Parish also had a small number of voters registered as upper case Independents. As of April 2007 there were 31 Libertarian Party members and 33 Reform Party registrants. The total registrants in April 2007 stood at 58,221.

Republican Eddie J. Lambert, an attorney in Gonzales who resides in Prairieville, has represented Ascension Parish in the Louisiana State Senate since 2016. Previously, he was the area state representative from 2004 to 2016. He unseated Juba Diez, the representative from 1976 to 2004.

Joe Sevario, a Prairieville businessman, served in the state Senate for District 18, including Ascension Parish, from 1976 to 1994.

On March 8, 2017, Ascension Parish President Kenneth Paul "Kenny" Matassa (born September 12, 1949), a Republican, along with Olin Glenn Berthelot (born August 1948), a Democratic  businessman from Gonzales, faced indictment in an attempted bribery scheme. The pair is charged with encouraging a candidate to withdraw from a local election on November 8, 2016. 

The grand jury released its true bill to Judge Tess Stromberg of the 23rd Judicial District Court in Ascension, Assumption, and St. James parishes. Among those who testified in the case were  Democratic Gonzales City Council member Neal Bourqueat. Matassa and Berthelot allegedly bribed the Democrat A. Wayne Lawson with offers of money and a government job to drop out of the city council race in Division E against Bourque, who nevertheless won reelection with 61 percent of the ballots cast.

Matassa and Berthelot turned themselves in to authorities and posted a $5,000 bond. Reports, meanwhile, surfaced of a move before the parish council calling for Matassa to resign. He cannot be forced from the office, however, unless convicted of the crime. Matassa and Berthelot could have received up to two years in state prison either with or without hard time and/or a fine of $2,000. Matassa was instead acquitted in July 2018 of the election bribery allegations and returned to his duties as parish president with a legal cloud lifted from his shoulders.

National Guard
The 922nd Engineer Company (Horizontal), a unit of the 769th Engineer Battalion and the 225th Engineer Brigade.  The 1021st Vertical Engineer Company also resides in Gonzales, Louisiana.

See also
 Acadian Coast
 National Register of Historic Places listings in Ascension Parish, Louisiana
 Johnny Berthelot
 Ralph Falsetta
 Eddie J. Lambert
 Sidney McCrory
 Edward J. Price
 Mert Smiley

References

Further reading
 McCulloh, R. P., P. V. Heinrich, and J. Snead, 2003, Ponchatoula 30 x 60 minute geologic quadrangle. Louisiana Geological Survey, Baton Rouge, Louisiana.

External links 

 Ascension Parish government's website
 Ascension Parish Sheriff's website
 Weekly Citizen newspaper
 Ascension Parish Library
 Explore the History and Culture of Southeastern Louisiana, a National Park Service Discover Our Shared Heritage Travel Itinerary
 Census shows shift
 Radio station website

 
Louisiana parishes
Parishes in Acadiana
Baton Rouge metropolitan area
Louisiana Isleño communities
Louisiana parishes on the Mississippi River
1807 establishments in the Territory of Orleans
Populated places established in 1807